The Ryan River is a short but major tributary of the Lillooet River in British Columbia, Canada, running largely eastward approximately  from its source on the eastern flank of the Pemberton Icefield before joining the Lillooet River in the area of Pemberton Meadows.

References
BCGNIS listing "Ryan River"

Rivers of the Pacific Ranges
Pemberton Valley